Pirasafneh (also Romanized as Pīrāsafneh and Pīr Esfaneh) is a village in Vardasht Rural District, in the Central District of Semirom County, Isfahan Province, Iran. At the 2006 census, its population was 172, in 31 families.

References 

Populated places in Semirom County